WQMC-LD, virtual channel 23 and UHF digital channel 15, branded on-air as GTN, is a low-powered independent television station licensed to Columbus, Ohio, United States. The station is owned by Urban One. It was formerly broadcast nationally via Sky Angel, prior to its shutdown.

History
From 1989 to 2008, W23BZ was owned by the Trinity Broadcasting Network, and served as a satellite repeater for the network.

On March 30, 2006, the station was granted a construction permit to begin converting operations to digital television.

In July 2008, it was announced that the Guardian Enterprise Group would sell its original, full-powered station, WSFJ-TV, to TBN for $16 million. In exchange, Guardian acquired W23BZ from TBN in an affiliation swap of their respective channels, and transferred WSFJ's programming to that channel on October 1, 2008. However, Guardian found themselves at a disadvantage, as, having moved to a low-power signal, they lost their must-carry status; as a result, Guardian urged viewers to contact their cable systems to pick up GTN after the move to channel 23. As of December 2009, Guardian reached an agreement for W23BZ to be carried on Insight Communications channel 283, and WOW channel 192, leaving Time Warner Cable as the sole cable system to yet carry W23BZ on either analog or digital services.

In late February 2011, W23BZ was off-the-air as it flash cut to digital broadcast. The station returned to the air as W23BZ-D on March 2, 2011.

On September 26, 2011, W23BZ-D picked up Bounce TV upon its launch; the station carried its programming on channel 23.1, mixed in with local programming and syndicated fare acquired from other sources.

On July 30, 2019, the station changed its call sign to WQMC-LD.

Digital channels
The station's digital signal is multiplexed:

See also
 .2 Network -- unrealized general entertainment network owned by the Guardian Enterprise Group

References

External links
Azteca Columbus Website
Guardian Studios Website
Guardian Enterprise Group Website
.2 Network Website

Bounce TV affiliates
Telemundo network affiliates
QMC-LD
Television channels and stations established in 1990
Low-power television stations in the United States
1990 establishments in Ohio